Kord Kheyl or Kord Khil may refer to:
 Kord Khil-e Valam, Gilan Province
 Kord Kheyl, Amol, Mazandaran Province
 Kord Kheyl, Juybar, Mazandaran Province
 Kord Kheyl, Ramsar, Mazandaran Province
 Kord Kheyl, Esfivard-e Shurab, Sari County, Mazandaran Province
 Kord Kheyl, Rudpey-ye Shomali, Sari County, Mazandaran Province